The 2022 Myanmar National League is scheduled to be the 13th season of the Myanmar National League, the highest domestic league in the country for association football clubs, since its establishment in 2009, also known as MPT Myanmar National League due to the sponsorship deal with Myanma Posts and Telecommunications. Recently, AIA agreed a sponsorship deal with Myanmar National League in order to support both MNL and Myanmar Football.

Participating teams
Title holders Shan United, Hanthawaddy, Ayeyawady, Yangon United, Yadanarbon, Rakhine United, Sagaing United, ISPE, Chinland and Myawady FC are all participating in this year's domestic league, due to the 2021 season was forced to be cancelled due to instability and public unrest. Due to security problem, all matches have to be played in a centralised venue, which is the Thuwunna Stadium in Yangon.

Clubs

Personnel and sponsoring
Note: Flags indicate national team as has been defined under FIFA eligibility rules. Players may hold more than one non-FIFA nationality.

Foreign players 

Players name in bold indicates the player was registered during the mid-season transfer window.

Season summary

After almost two years of domestic football absence in Myanmar, the league made a surprise return. It consisted of the ten teams that were scheduled to participate in the 2021 Myanmar National League, which was cancelled due to the virus and subsequent protests. This meant that matches were played in only one stadium, the Thuwunna Stadium. Some players returned from international duty with the Myanmar national football team, with the addition of clubs also signing new players.

The opening match was between Myawady and Yangon United. Yangon United won 2-0 with goals from La Min Htwe and new signing Htet Phyo Wai. Two teams that are rivals, but also teams that came close to winning the 2020 Myanmar National League went head-to-head in the first matchday. Hanthawaddy United came out on top against Ayeyawady United. Winning goals were scored by Soe Kyaw Kyaw and Nyi Nyi Aung. The next matches saw Shan United and ISPE defeat Mahar United and Rakhine United. The final match of Week 1 saw an obliteration as returning GFA were thrashed by Yadanarbon by a margin of 7-0. 

Following the first week, Hanthawaddy United were given a big confidence boost following their win over Ayeyawady United. However, they were stunned by Mahar United with a goal from Myo Min Phyo, his first of the season. Ayeyawady United's star strikers Yan Kyaw Htwe and Yar Za Aung scored their first goals in an emphatic win over Rakhine United. Myawady bounced back from opening-day defeat with a win over ISPE, while Shan United counted themselves lucky with a narrow win over minnows GFA. The MNL derby took place between Yangon United and Yadanarbon, but Yangon United were the victorious team with great goals from Htet Phyo Wai and David Htan.

Hanthawaddy United continued to lose as they fell into ISPE's hands in the first match of Week 3. The second match saw Yan Kyaw Htwe score a hat-trick over Mahar United, as well as Kaung Myat Thu scoring two and Si Thu Naing scoring his first goal in a 6-1 win. Yadanarbon also lost their second match to Shan United, with an early Nanda Kyaw goal sealing their fate in the match. In the fourth match, GFA narrowly lost to Myawady by a scoreline of 4-2, with Thet Wai Moe, Kaung Si Thu and Ye Moe Yan scoring, with the addition of a surprise Tun Nanda Oo penalty. Consolation goals were scored by Yaw Kusi and Than Toe Aung. Yangon United escaped with another win, this time against Rakhine United with a late goal from David Htan.

Two teams out of form, Hanthawaddy United and Yadanarbon, played out a 1-1 draw, with both goals being penalties. GFA won their first match of the season after another 4-2 result, but this time a win. Shan United escaped with yet another narrow win, this time against ISPE. Min Myat Soe scored two for ISPE, while Nanda Kyaw scored a brace and Sunday Matthew finished ISPE's chances of winning. Yangon United's weaknesses were exposed by Kaung Myat Thu, who scored a hat-trick in the first half, resulting in a 3-0 win for Ayeyawady United. Rakhine United could count themselves unlucky after a late goal scored by Kaung Si Thu for Myawady.

Hanthawaddy used their squad quality to their advantage against GFA, winning 10-0. Soe Kyaw Kyaw and Aung Myat Thu scored hat-tricks. In the next match, Yangon United defeated Mahar United 5-0. Four goals from La Min Htwe and one from Zaw Win Thein got the Lions back on track. Two big matches played out, as Ayeyawady held ISPE to a goalless draw, and Mark Sekyi scored in a win for Shan United against Myawady. Yadanarbon got back on track too, as they defeated Rakhine United 3-0. GFA were included in yet another 4-2 scoreline, but this time in the losing end as Ayeyawady United defeated them. ISPE and Yangon United played out a goalless draw, Shan United defeated Rakhine United with goals from Ti Nyein Min and Ye Min Thu, Myo Min Phyo scoring two in a win against Yadanarbon and Myawady shocking Hanthawaddy United.

Week 7 began with giants facing off: Shan United and Yangon United. Win Naing Tun got a red card, and Zin Min Tun scored the only goal for Shan United. Yadanarbon and Ayeyawady were held to a 0-0 draw. Myawady thrashed Mahar United, Hanthawaddy defeated Rakhine United and ISPE demolished GFA.  Following this matchday, Shan United still had a perfect record. Rakhine United also have a perfect record, but for losses instead. Nanda Kyaw scored the winning goal for Shan United against Ayeyawady. Yangon United got back on track with a 2-1 win over Hanthawaddy, with Htet Phyo Wai and Zaw Win Thein scoring the winning goals. Khin Kyaw Win's goal against Mahar United secured ISPE three more points, Yadanarbon eased past Myawady and the two bottom teams faced off: Rakhine United and GFA, with GFA being victors after a late goal from Than Toe Aung. 

Following Week 8, the transfer window was reopened. Yangon United signed veteran Valci Teixeira Junior. Shan United signed Si Thu Aung, Myat Kaung Khant and Zin Phyo Aung. Rakhine United signed multiple foreign players including Dylan Santiago, Conde Mamoudou, Ibrahim Kasule and Hiroya Radonjic.

With the transfer window still open, Week 9 played with the opening match consisting of out-of-form Hantharwady United, and in-form Shan United. The match ended 2-2, ending Shan United's winning streak. Myo Zaw Oo scored the opening goal, but it was cancelled off by Kyaw Zin Lwin. Mark Sekyi scored a bicycle kick but Aung Myo Thura scored the equalizer. Naing Zin Htet's hat-trick gave Myawady a win over Ayeyawady United, and a Mahar United eased 2-1 past Rakhine United. Kyaw Phyo Wai and Junior scored their first goals for Yangon United in a win over GFA, and Week 9 ended with Yadanarbon overwhelming ISPE 3-1.  Two goals from Thet Naing led Yadanarbon to victory. 

Week 10 saw a late goal from Nanda Kyaw in a narrow 1-0 win over Myawady. Conde Mamodou lost 2-4 loss to Yadanarbon. Win Naing Tun, Sa Aung Pyae Ko and Yan Paing Soe scored their first Yangon United goals in a 3-0 win over Mahar United. Hantharwady defeated GFA, this time by a narrow scoreline. Yan Kyaw Htwe continued his strong goalscoring form alongside a goal from Aung Naing Win. Week 11 saw giants facing each other again, but in a goalless draw. Yangon United and Shan United defences held firm until 90 minutes for a point each. Another lucky goal from Hantharwady saw them earn a narrow win over Rakhine United. GFA lost 3-1 to ISPE, while Ayeyawady United defeated Yadanarbon with some controversy surrounding the match. Mahar United lost 2-1 against Myawady, in which the goals came late in the game. 

Myanmar national team head coach Antoine Hey had called up 25 players for friendly matches in Hong Kong, in which they lost one and drew one. Due to this, matches were postponed to the end of the season. However, two of Mahar United's matches were continued. They lost both matches, against Hantharwady and GFA.

Week 14 matches started with Yadanarbon playing Shan United. Thet Naing scored the operner but it was later cancelled out by Zin Min Tun in the 25th minute for a 1-1 draw. After this, Yangon United trounced Rakhine United 10-0 with five goals from Win Naing Tun, a hat-trick for Valci Jr. and goals from Hein Zeyar Lin and Yan Naing Oo. More goals came in the next match, as Ayeyawady defeated Mahar United 6-1. Hantharwady and Myawady then defeated ISPE and GFA respectively. 

Shan United became one step closer to winning the MNL title in Week 15 as they defeated Mahar United 2-0. Rakhine United lost 4-1 to ISPE and Ayeyawady and Hantharwady's match ended in the same scoreline in favour of Hantharwady with goals from Nay Moe Naing and Win Moe Kyaw. Valci Jr. scored the lone goal in a Yangon United win against Myawady. Yadanarbon defeated GFA 1-0 in the final match of Week 15. Shan United needed a lucky edge to defeat out-of-form Ayeyawady United. Hantharwady's win against Yangon United created a huge gap in the top of the table and also equalled points with Yangon United, who still had a match to play. ISPE and Mahar United shared points and Yadanarbon won against a winless Myawady side in multiple matches. The bottom of the table teams drew 2-2. 

Yangon United defeated ISPE 3-0. Yadanarbon failed to use their chances to full effect in a goalless draw against Mahar United. An 8-goal game saw Ayeyawady defeat GFA 5-3, and Hantharwady continued their great form in a win against Myawady. Rakhine United got relegated after a 2-0 loss against Shan United. ISPE defied odds in a 2-1 win against Yadanarbon, and Myawady finally won a match after four consecutive losses. Rakhine United won their first match of the season against Mahar United, and Yangon eased past GFA.

Shan United played Hantharwady United in a match that saw Shan United prevail and thus secure the Myanmar National League. This was their third consecutive title and fourth overall. Myat Kaung Khant scored a long-range goal, and Si Thu Aung finished the match off with a penalty to secure the title. The win resulted in Shan United qualifying for the AFC Cup group stage, and Yangon United locking their spot in the playoffs. Shan United were given a standing ovation by GFA whom they defeated 2-0 with goals from Si Thu Aung. GFA were relegated and will have to play in MNL-2 next season.

Another Myanmar National League match was played between two fierce rivals: Yadanarbon and Yangon United. Valci Jr. scores a goal to the top corner and opens the scoring in the 18th minute. Before the first half ended, Junior scored his second goal and eighth of the season with another goal, this time from a rebound. David Htan scored his third goal of the season with Win Naing Tun's near-cross, and Sa Aung Pyae Ko scored his third of the season shortly after coming on. Ye Yint Aung scored a consolation penalty and Thu Rein Soe scored an own goal. Hlaing Bo Bo was given his second red card of the season after complaining to the referee, seeing him leave the pitch in tears and slam his water bottle.

League table

Positions by round

Results by match played

Results

Season statistics

Top scorers
As of  20 Nov 2022.

Most assists
As of 15 Dec 2022.

Clean sheets
As of 15 Dec 2022.

Hat-tricks

Half-season transfer

References

Myanmar National League seasons
2022 in Asian association football leagues